The Jungle Khel Eidgah, located near Peshawar bypass road in jungle khel , was built by Maulana Asim with the funding of Ex mna Miss Khursheed Begum and contribution of other people. Eidgah is the term used in Islamic culture for the open-air gathering place usually outside the city to perform the Salat al Eid (Eid prayers) for Eid al-Fitr and Eid al-Adha. It is usually a public place that isn't used as a mosque at other times of the year. At the end of the holy month of Ramadan, Muslims celebrate by first offering prayers at an Eidgah. It is a large open ground for people to assemble and offer their prayers early in the morning on the Eid day. Although the term eidgah is of South Asian origin, Muslims around the world generally perform Eid prayers on similar pieces of open ground.

Eid (Islam)
Mosques in Pakistan